Anthony Bourne Howard (born 27 August 1946) is a  former West Indies international cricketer who played in one Test match in 1972, taking two wickets for 140 in a drawn match against New Zealand.

He played 31 first class matches from 1965–66 to 1974–75, representing the West Indies and Barbados, and took 85 wickets with his off spin. He retired at the age of 29 to pursue a career in business, but remained involved in cricket, and became manager of the Barbados team in 1998 before taking over the national team in March 2004.

References

1946 births
Living people
Barbados cricketers
West Indies Test cricketers
Barbadian cricketers
People from Saint Michael, Barbados